Atiq Ullah (born 1 January 1983), also known as Ateequllah, is a Pakistani footballer who plays for NBP FC. He is also a member of the Pakistan national football team.

Atiq Ullah plays as a midfielder. He won the Geo Super Football League with Islamabad United in 2007. Atiq Ullah earned his first international cap in 2005.

Honours

With Islamabad United
Geo Super Football League 2007

References

1983 births
Living people
Pakistani footballers
Pakistan international footballers
Association football midfielders